Inspector Hornleigh is a 1938 British detective film directed by Eugene Forde, starring Gordon Harker and Alastair Sim, with Miki Hood, Wally Patch, Steven Geray and Edward Underdown. The film was shot at Pinewood Studios in England. The screenplay was co-written by Bryan Edgar Wallace.

Plot
Inspector Hornleigh of Scotland Yard stumbles upon the theft of the Chancellor of the Exchequer's budget secrets, a crime which he ties to a murder he is investigating.

Cast
 Gordon Harker as Inspector Hornleigh
 Alastair Sim as Sergeant Bingham
 Miki Hood as Ann Gordon
 Wally Patch as Sam Holt
 Steven Geray as Michael Kavanos
 Edward Underdown as Peter Dench
 Hugh Williams as Bill Gordon
 Gibb McLaughlin as Alfred Cooper
 Ronald Adam as Wittens
 Eliot Makeham as Alexander Parkinson, leather worker
 Peter Gawthorne as the Chancellor of the Exchequer (uncredited)
 Charles Carson as Chief Superintendent (uncredited)
 Vi Kaley as Landlady (uncredited)
 Julian Vedey as Cafe Proprietor (uncredited)

Production
The film is a spin-off from a popular BBC radio series of the 1930s, Inspector Hornleigh Investigates, created and written by Hans Wolfgang Priwin, which ran on the BBC from 1937 to 1940.

The screenplay was not written by Priwin and the leading characters are somewhat modified. The actor who played Inspector Hornleigh on the BBC, S.J. Warmington, is replaced by comedian Gordon Harker, and is given a bumbling sidekick, played by Alastair Sim, solely as comic relief. The BBC series was a serious detective drama, but in the film the two leading characters play the script for laughs, and the casting of two well-known comedy stars in the parts indicates that this was the director's intention. The rest of the cast behave as if they are in a straight drama, highlighting the behaviour of Harker and Sim.

To emphasise that this was a comedy film series, and to enhance the comedy double-act between Harker and Sim, the subsequent films in the series were written by the comedy writers Frank Launder and Sidney Gilliat.

Although the film was released in 1939, it carries a copyright notice dated 1938. It was made by Argyle Television Films, but was given a cinema release in the UK.

Reception
The film was sufficiently well-received by audiences to justify two sequels: Inspector Hornleigh on Holiday (1939), and Inspector Hornleigh Goes To It (1940).

 The New York Times called the film "a neat bit of British detective fictionizing, as tailor-made as a Bond Street jacket, now on view at the Rialto".
 TV Guide wrote, "though the film is well-plotted and well-acted (Sim is hilarious), the thick English and Scottish accents were often incomprehensible to American audiences. Aside from that, the suspense is nicely built towards a good denouement".
 Vintage 45 wrote, "this works as a mystery and the occasional snide remarks between Hornleigh and Bingham work to lighten things up a bit. The movie is fun and clever".

References

External links
 

1938 films
1938 mystery films
British crime films
British detective films
British black-and-white films
Films directed by Eugene Forde
Films set in London
20th Century Fox films
Films shot at Pinewood Studios
1938 crime films
1930s British films